General elections were held in Brazil on 3 October 1950. The presidential elections were won by Getúlio Vargas of the Brazilian Labour Party, whilst the Social Democratic Party remained the largest party in both the Chamber of Deputies and the Senate, although they lost their majority in the former. Voter turnout was 72.1% in the presidential election, 72.0% in the Chamber elections and 77.7% in the Senate elections.

Background
After living in self-imposed exile in his Riograndense ranch between his overthrow in 1945 and 1950, former President Getúlio Vargas, who had already been elected a senator in 1945, decided to run for the Presidency, as the candidate of the Brazilian Labor Party (PTB), one of the two he founded after he decided to put an end to his 15-year dictatorship. Vargas, although in exile, remained active on the sidelines of Brazilian politics during the Presidency of his former War Minister, Eurico Gaspar Dutra. He notably criticized his successor's economic policies, taking a hard nationalist and populist tone which appealed to the base of the PTB, organized labour.

In April 1950, the Social Democratic Party, also pro-Vargas but based more around industrialists and state political machines, rejected the idea of forming a coalition with the PTB or the UDN and decided to run its own candidate. They nominated Cristiano Machado, a little-known congressman for Minas Gerais.

However, Vargas was able to forge an alliance with a number of PSD state leaders, notably in his own state of Rio Grande do Sul and in Rio de Janeiro. In Pernambuco, he even forged an alliance with his traditional rivals, the UDN. This phenomenon - to nominate a candidate and support another - became known as "cristianization" in Brazil. In the state of São Paulo, he forged an alliance with Adhemar de Barros' Social Progressive Party (PSP), a populist electoral machine who dominated state politics. The PSP was the only other party to officially endorse him, and provided him with his running-mate (who was separately elected), João Café Filho. Vargas also assured himself of the support, or at least approval, of the military which had deposed him in 1945. He reconciled himself with the dominant figure of the military then, Góes Monteiro, who had played a role in his 1945 overthrow.

The center-right National Democratic Union (UDN), noted for its radical anti-Vargas posture, once again nominated Eduardo Gomes as its candidate. The party proved woefully unable to expand its narrow electoral base, and not even the anti-Vargas rhetoric of 1945 could deliver more votes. The UDN and Gomes also proved their little comprehension of the evolving Brazilian political scene by supporting abolishing the minimum wage instituted in Vargas' past administration.

During the Eurico Gaspar Dutra administration, the Brazilian Communist Party had its license revoked by the Superior Electoral Court in the context of the early Cold War. Communists oriented their followers not to vote, but a significant share of them voted on Vargas.

Presidential candidates
Former President Getúlio Vargas of Rio Grande do Sul (PTB)
Former Air Minister Eduardo Gomes of Rio de Janeiro (UDN)
Congressman Cristiano Machado of Minas Gerais (PSD)
João Mangabeira (PSB)

Results

President
Vargas won a convincing victory, with 48.7% of the vote and close to an absolute majority of votes cast. Despite the UDN's claim that he was not constitutionally elected (they claimed that a candidate needed an absolute majority of the votes), Vargas was inaugurated President in January 1951.

As of 2023, this remains the last time that the bellwether state of Minas Gerais voted for the losing candidate.

Vice-President

Chamber of Deputies

Senate

References

Brazil
General
General elections in Brazil
Brazil
Election and referendum articles with incomplete results